The 2009–10 Elite Women's Hockey League season was the sixth season of the Elite Women's Hockey League, a multi-national women's ice hockey league. ESC Planegg/Würmtal of Germany won the league title.

Final standings

External links
Season on hockeyarchives.info

Elite Women's
European Women's Hockey League seasons
Euro